The Senate Foreign Relations Subcommittee on East Asia, The Pacific, and International Cybersecurity Policy is one of seven subcommittees of the Senate Foreign Relations Committee.

Jurisdiction
The subcommittee deals with all matters concerning U.S. relations with the countries of East Asia and the Pacific as well as regional intergovernmental organizations like the Association of South East Asian Nations and the Asia-Pacific Economic Cooperation forum.  This subcommittee’s regional responsibilities include all matters within the geographic region, including matters relating to: (1) terrorism and non-proliferation; (2) crime and illicit narcotics; (3) U.S. foreign assistance programs; and (4) the promotion of U.S. trade and exports.

In addition, this subcommittee has global responsibility for international cybersecurity and space policy.

Members, 117th Congress

See also

U.S. House Financial Services Subcommittee on Asia, the Pacific, and the Global Environment

External links
Senate Committee on Foreign Relations
Senate Foreign Relations Committee subcommittees and jurisdictions

Foreign Relations Senate East Asian and Pacific Affairs